Mesme may be,

Mesme language
Mesme Taşbağ

See also
Ruby Butler DeMesme
Sainte-Mesme
Mesmes (disambiguation)